Nothropus is an extinct genus of ground sloth of the family Nothrotheriidae, endemic to South America during the Pleistocene epoch. It was believed to be a ground-dwelling herbivore.

Taxonomy 
Nothropus priscus and Nothropus nordenskioldi are described as subtaxa. Nothropus was named by Hermann Burmeister (1882). It was assigned to Megalonychidae by L. G. Marshall and T. Sempere (1991) and to Nothrotheriidae by Christian de Muizon et al. (2004).

Fossil distribution
Fossils have been uncovered from the Tarija Formation, Tarija Department, Bolivia, east side of the Andes Mountains.

References 

 Classification of Mammals by Malcolm C. McKenna and Susan K. Bell

Prehistoric sloths
Prehistoric placental genera
Pleistocene xenarthrans
Pleistocene first appearances
Pleistocene extinctions
Pleistocene mammals of South America
Ensenadan
Pleistocene Bolivia
Fossils of Bolivia
Fossil taxa described in 1882